Haworthia mucronata is a species of the genus Haworthia in the family Asphodelaceae, endemic to the Little Karoo region, in the Western Cape Province of South Africa.

Etymology

The genus name Haworthia honors the British botanist Adrian Hardy Haworth (1767–1833), while the species epitheton mucronata ("pointy") derives from Latin and refers to the pointed leaf-shape.

Description 
Plants grow as tight proliferous clumps of offsetting rosettes. As one of the soft-leaved, pale-green group of Haworthias it is frequently confused with its relatives (e.g. Haworthia cooperi, Haworthia cymbiformis and Haworthia marumiana). It also hybridises naturally with Haworthia arachnoidea in habitat, and the two seem to form a continuum.

The distinctive feature of this species is the transparency of the keel and margins of the leaves. This distinguishes it from most of its relatives. Some plants have bristles along their leaf margins but this is not a distinguishing feature. 
The plants are relatively small. The leaves are mildly incurved, ovate-lanceolate, and are packed - dense and numerous - within the rosette.

Distribution
This species is relatively common in habitat, being found from Barrydale to Oudtshoorn. It is endemic to the Little Karoo region, in the Western Cape Province of South Africa.

Varieties

References

mucronata
Flora of the Cape Provinces
Endemic flora of South Africa
Garden plants